The Chiniguchi Waterway Provincial Park consists of  of protected wilderness along the Chiniguchi River, Maskinonge Lake, Kukagami Lake, Wolf Lake and Matagamasi Lake in the Sudbury District of Ontario, that includes 336 hectares of Forest Reserve. The park is one of the several provincial parks located in the Sudbury area. It is managed by Ontario Parks. It contains the largest stand of old growth Red Pines.

This river is only suitable for backcountry canoeists; there are no facilities in the park. Canoeists should be able to portage.

Wolf Lake Forest Reserve
The Wolf Lake Forest Reserve contains the world's largest remaining old-growth red pine forest; containing trees up to 300 years old.

References

External links

New Chiniguichi River Waterway, Ottertooth.com

Provincial parks of Ontario
Parks in Sudbury District
Parks in Greater Sudbury
Protected areas established in 2006
2006 establishments in Ontario